This is a list of Greek war and defence ministers.

Ministers of Military Affairs, 1899–1946

Ministers for Military Affairs, Naval Affairs & Aviation, 1946

Ministers of Military Affairs, 1946–1950

Ministers for Military Affairs, Naval Affairs & Aviation, 1950

Ministers for National Defence, 1950–present

Defence